Young & Full of the Devil is the second studio album by Australian rock band, Magic Dirt. It was released in April 1998 and peaked at number 100 on the ARIA Charts.

Background
The album was recorded in 12 days in 1997 at Birdland Studios. It was the first album to feature lead guitarist Raul Sanchez as Dave Thomas departed due to creative differences in mid-1997.

According to bass player Dean Turner the band smoked hash and took some acid during the recording process, saying "We went in there and just had a good time you know. Just worked like 15, 17 hours a day."

Producer Lindsay Gravina said, "This record stands apart because in the purest sense, it's essentially an art record. This album captured the whole zeitgeist of those times, a fucking apocalyptic catharsis, for us personally, but also for the times in general – a last hurrah for a scene that had signalled its peak, and who better to call it?"

Reception
Reviewed in Rolling Stone Australia said that the album was devoid of the band's previous dalliances with pop music. All the songs were, "very long and either loud, quiet, or alternating both." The album was described as unsatisfying, and it was noted, "Massive guitar onslaughts get boring, and frankly there's not much else going on in the way of either psychology or playfulness."

Track listing
 "Babycakes" - 6:45
 "She-Riff" - 5:06
 "Rabbit with Fangs" - 2:40
 "Shrinko" - 2:44
 "What Have I Done?" - 3:09
 "These Drugs are Really Starting to Fuck Me Over" - 5:29
 "Short Black" - 1:24
 "X-Ray" - 7:05
 "Ascot Red" - 7:22
 "Babycakes You Always Freeze Me Up" - 18:27

Charts

Release history

References

1998 albums
Magic Dirt albums